General elections were held in the Solomon Islands on 6 August 1997. A total of 350 candidates representing nine parties contested the election, the result of which was a victory for the Solomon Islands National Unity and Reconciliation Party (SINURP), which won 21 of the 50 seats. However, Bartholomew Ulufa'alu, leader of the Liberal Party, was elected Prime Minister by Parliament, defeating SINURP leader Solomon Mamaloni.

Results

References

Solomons
1997 in the Solomon Islands
Elections in the Solomon Islands
Election and referendum articles with incomplete results